MS Hans Hedtoft was a Danish cargo passenger liner that struck an iceberg and sank on 30 January 1959 on her maiden voyage off the coast of Western Greenland. The only piece of the wreckage ever found was a lifebelt. , she remains the last known ship sunk by an iceberg with casualties.

Description

Hans Hedtoft was built by Frederikshavns Værft at Frederikshavn in northern Denmark. She was yard number 226, launched on 13 August 1958 and completed on 17 December. She had a double bottom and seven watertight compartments and an armoured bow and stern. She was designed to provide a year-round service between Denmark and Greenland. Hans Hedtoft had a riveted hull, a feature which was criticised by Knud Lauritzen, a shipowner. Lauritzen claimed that a riveted hull was not as resistant to ice pressure as a welded hull. Hans Hedtoft had the code letters and radio call sign OXKA. The ship was named after a former prime minister of Denmark.

The ship was armed with three 40 mm anti-aircraft guns, on the orders of the Danish Ministry of Defence (MoD). The armament was not part of the original plans, and the ship was strengthened in three places to take the guns. An ammunition room was built into the bow of the ship. The MoD provided the anti-aircraft guns free of charge. Although fitted during tests, the guns were dismounted and carried aboard Hans Hedtoft at the time of her sinking. An order had been issued that the guns were to be removed from the ship immediately after she arrived back in Copenhagen. It was claimed that the arming of Hans Hedtoft resulted in a warship being constructed without the approval of the Folketing.

Sinking
Hans Hedtoft sailed from Copenhagen on her maiden voyage on 7 January 1959. Her voyage to Julianehaab, Greenland, was made in record time. Hans Hedtoft called at Nuuk, Sisimiut and Maniitsoq before returning to Julianehaab.

On 29 January, she began her return journey. The ship had 40 crew, 55 passengers and a cargo of frozen fish on board and in addition to that 3.25 tons of archives concerning Greenlandic history. One of her passengers was the Danish parliament (Folketing) member Augo Lynge. The call was answered by USCGC Campbell, the West German trawler Johannes Krüss of Bremerhaven and another West German trawler. Within an hour, another message was sent stating that the engine room was flooded. At 15:12, it was announced that the ship was sinking. A final message was sent at 17:41 stating the ship was slowly sinking and requesting immediate assistance. Aircraft in Newfoundland were grounded by the weather and unable to assist in the search for Hans Hedtoft. The beginning of an SOS was received by Johannes Krüss at 18:06 after which communication with Hans Hedtoft was lost. On 31 January, USCGC Campbell reported that conditions were  worse than anything the ship had seen while on transatlantic convoy duty during World War II, and there was no sign of Hans Hedtoft or her passengers and crew. The search was called off on 7 February. The only piece of wreckage ever recovered was a lifebuoy which washed ashore on Iceland and was discovered on 7 October 1959, some nine months after the ship sank. The ship sank with parish registers from parishes of Greenland, which were meant to be deposited in archives in Denmark, causing a major loss for Greenlandic genealogy.

As a result of the sinking, the airfield at Narsarsuaq, Greenland, which had closed in November 1958, was reopened. An appeal fund for the relatives of the victims was opened. Kr40,000 (then £2,000) was raised amongst ten countries in two months. Compensation for the relatives amounted to Kr1,184,936 (then £59,000). Like RMS Titanic, Hans Hedtoft was said to be the safest ship afloat, being described as "unsinkable" by some.

As of 2023, the wreck remains undiscovered at the bottom of the North Atlantic.

Legacy

On 30 January 2005, Queen Margrethe unveiled a monument at North Atlantic Wharf, Copenhagen, to the 95 people lost on Hans Hedtoft.

The shipwreck is the theme of the 2014 song "All Hope Abandon" by the Greenlandic band Small Time Giants.

References

External links 

 Projekt Hans Hedtoft 1959–2009 
 Overview and pictures 
 LIFE Magazine Feb. 16, 1959

Maritime incidents in 1959
Passenger ships of Denmark
Shipwrecks in the Atlantic Ocean
1958 ships
1959 in Denmark
Ships lost with all hands
Ships sunk by icebergs
Ships built in Denmark
January 1959 events in North America
1959 disasters in Denmark